Jorge Abdiel Gutiérrez Cornejo (born 1 September 1998) is a Panamanian football player who plays as left-back for Tauro, and the Panama national team.

Career
Gutiérrez began his senior career with the Panamanian club Tauro. For the 2020–21 season, he joined the Spanish club Melilla on loan in the Primera División RFEF.

International career
Gutiérrez made his debut for the Panama national team in a 0-0 friendly tie with Peru on 16 January 2022.

Honours
Tauro F.C.
Liga Panameña de Fútbol: 2016-17 Clausura, 2018-19 Clausura, 2019 Apertura, 2021 Clausura

References

External links
 
 

1998 births
Living people
Sportspeople from Panama City
Panamanian footballers
Panama international footballers
Panama youth international footballers
Association football fullbacks
Tauro F.C. players
UD Melilla footballers
Liga Panameña de Fútbol players
Primera Federación players
Panamanian expatriate footballers
Panamanian expatriates in Spain
Expatriate footballers in Spain